Cormont is a commune in the Pas-de-Calais department in the Hauts-de-France region of France.

Geography
A village situated some 12 miles (19 km) southeast of Boulogne-sur-Mer on the D147 and D146 road junction.

History
Mentioned first in 826, as "Curmons".

Places of interest
The twelfth century church of St. Michel.

Population

See also
 Communes of the Pas-de-Calais department

References

Communes of Pas-de-Calais